Simon Antoine Jean L'Huilier (or L'Huillier) (24 April 1750 in Geneva – 28 March 1840 in Geneva) was a Swiss mathematician of French Huguenot descent. He is known for his work in mathematical analysis and topology, and in particular the generalization of Euler's formula for planar graphs.

He won the mathematics section prize of the Berlin Academy of Sciences for 1784 in response to a question on the foundations of the calculus. The work was published in his 1787 book Exposition elementaire des principes des calculs superieurs. (A Latin version was published in 1795.) Although L'Huilier won the prize, Joseph Lagrange, who had suggested the question and was the lead judge of the submissions, was disappointed in the work, considering it "the best of a bad lot." Lagrange would go on to publish his own work on foundations.

L'Huilier and Cauchy
L'Huilier introduced the abbreviation "lim" for limit that reappeared in 1821 in Cours d'Analyse by Augustin Louis Cauchy, who would later create his approach based on infinitesimals defined in terms of variable quantities.

Royal Society fellow
He was elected in May, 1791 a Fellow of the Royal Society

Note that this surname is sometimes rendered as Lhuilier or Lhuillier.

Notes

External links

1750 births
1840 deaths
18th-century scientists from the Republic of Geneva
Fellows of the Royal Society
19th-century Swiss mathematicians
Mathematicians from the Republic of Geneva
Members of the Göttingen Academy of Sciences and Humanities